Telstra Corporate Centre is an office skyscraper in Melbourne, Australia. Standing 218 m high with 47 floors (43 used as offices), it is the 13th tallest in Melbourne. It is located at 242 Exhibition Street. It is the world headquarters for Telstra and includes a small retail precinct located on the ground floor towards the Little Lonsdale St side.

The building was designed by the large commercial architects Perrot Lyon Matheison. It was opened in 1992 and the building was fully refurbished in 2010 by Lend Lease to include a Telstra store, 2 new cafes, two 15m square HD media walls as well as the food court area. The new reception area features Australia's largest indoor vertical live garden.

References

Skyscrapers in Melbourne
Telstra
Office buildings in Melbourne
Skyscraper office buildings in Australia
Office buildings completed in 1992
Corporate headquarters
1992 establishments in Australia
Buildings and structures in Melbourne City Centre